Mizpah ( miṣpāh, 'watch-tower, look-out') was a city of the tribe of Benjamin referred to in the Hebrew Bible.

Tell en-Nasbeh is one of three sites often identified with Mizpah of Benjamin, and is located about 12 kilometers north of Jerusalem. The other suggested locations are Nabi Samwil, which is some 8 kilometers north-west of the Old City of Jerusalem (situated on the loftiest hill in the vicinity, above the plain of Gibeon), and Sh'afat, a village situated on a flat spur to the northwest of Jerusalem and where Jerusalem is visible from the village.

Biblical references
The first mention of Mizpah was in Genesis where Laban and his son-in-law Jacob made an agreement that God will watch over them while they were apart from each other. It was marked by the piling of rocks. It was a reminder of peace where each would not go beyond these rocks to attack the other.

When a Levite traveler's concubine was raped by the men of Gibeah, the other tribes of Israel met at Mizpah of Benjamin, where they decided to attack the men of Benjamin for this grievous sin. At the same time, the decision was made not to permit marriage between Israelite women and Benjaminite men.

After the return of the Ark of the Covenant, lost to the Philistines following the Israelites' defeat at the Battle of Aphek, Samuel gathered all Israel at Mizpah to offer a sacrifice to the Lord and ask Him to forgive their sin. The Israelites fought off a raid by the Philistines, taking advantage of the assembly, and drove them back as far as below Beth Car. To memorialize this event, Samuel set up a stone between Mizpah and Shen and named it Eben-Ezer ("stone of help"), because the Lord had helped them.

Samuel also gathered the people of Israel to Mizpah for the Lord to identify their first king. There, Saul was chosen by lot from all the tribes and families of Israel.

During the reigns of Asa, king of Judah, and Baasha, king of Israel, Mizpah was one of two cities which Asa built up from the stones Baasha had used to fortify Ramah.

After the Babylonians had destroyed Jerusalem, they appointed Gedaliah governor in Mizpah over the remaining residents. Many returned to Mizpah from where they had fled. The prophet Jeremiah came to Mizpah from Ramah, where the Babylonians had released him. Later Ishmael, a member of the royal family, assassinated Gedaliah. Despite Jeremiah's warning that the people would be a reproach and die if they went to Egypt, they persisted in going there.

Mizpah is mentioned in the Book of Nehemiah as one of the towns resettled by the Jewish exiles returning from the Babylonian captivity and who helped to construct the walls of Jerusalem during the reign of Artaxerxes I (Xerxes). Nehemiah further records that those returnees were the very descendants of the people who had formerly resided in the town before their banishment from the country, who had all returned to live in their former places of residence.

Identification 
The main contenders for the site of Mizpah are Tell en-Nasbeh, nearby Nebi Samwil, and Shuafat.

 The suggested site of Shuafat is based on its etymology, meaning "prospect," which is thought to be a corruption of the old name Mizpah or Sapha. In addition, the place fits the description of being "over against Jerusalem" (I Macc. III 46) 
 Y. Aharoni suggested identifying Tell en-Nasbeh with Mizpah in Benjamin.<ref>{{cite book |last=Aharoni|first=Y. |author-link=Yohanan Aharoni |title=The Land of the Bible: A Historical Geography|edition=2 |publisher=Westminster Press |location=Philadelphia|year=1979|page=439 |language=en|isbn=0664242669 |oclc=6250553}} (original Hebrew edition: 'Land of Israel in Biblical Times - Historical Geography', Bialik Institute, Jerusalem (1962))</ref>
 Mizpah was located right next to Gibeon. (Some suggest that if Mizpah was Tell en-Nasbeh'' on the Nablus road, Ishmael would not have fled to Ammon via Gibeon which is located to the West near Neby Samwil which overlooks Jerusalem.)
 Mizpah is where Judas Maccabeus and his rebel army camped before the Battle of Emmaus during the Maccabean Revolt according to the book of 1 Maccabees.  "Then they gathered together and went to Mizpah, opposite Jerusalem, because Israel formerly had a place of prayer in Mizpah."  Mizpah was in the hills, while the nearby Greek Syrian camp in Emmaus was on the plain.  Judas proceeded to hold a religious ceremony at Mizpah where he picked a smaller force with which to ambush the Seleucid camp the next day.
 Nebi Samwil has produced no remains of the Iron Age I, nor any remains of the 6th century, both periods in which Mizpah was occupied. By contrast, Tell en-Nasbeh has produced abundant remains from both periods, and moreover, has a massive fortification system which matches well with the building campaign of King Asa of Judah in the early 9th century BC. Its location on the main road leading out of Jerusalem fits well with the reference to Mizpah in the First Books of Kings.

References

Hebrew Bible cities
Tribe of Benjamin